Mesaegle is a monotypic moth genus of the family Erebidae. Its only species, Mesaegle gouzzakouli, is found in Algeria. Both the genus and species were first described by Constantin Dumont in 1922.

References

Calpinae
Monotypic moth genera